Mysuru railway division is one of the three railway divisions under South Western Railway zone of Indian Railways. This railway division was formed on 5 November 1951 and its headquarter is located at Mysuru in the state of Karnataka in India.

Bengaluru railway division and Hubballi Railway division are the other railway divisions under SWR Zone headquartered at  Hubballi.

List of railway stations and towns 
The list includes the stations  under the Mysuru railway division and their station category.

Stations closed for Passengers -

References

 
Divisions of Indian Railways
1951 establishments in Mysore State